During the 1975–76 English football season, Everton F.C. competed in the Football League First Division. They finished 11th in the table with 42 points.

Final League Table

Results

Football League First Division

FA Cup

League Cup

UEFA Cup

Squad

References

1975–76
Everton F.C. season